Transhuman is the fifth studio album by American technical thrash metal band Believer, released on April 11, 2011 on Metal Blade Records.

Overview
A concept album, the band stated that the lyrics deal with transhumanism, "The study of the ramifications, promises, and potential dangers of technologies that will enable us to overcome fundamental human limitations, and the related study of the ethical matters involved in developing and using such technologies." The band stated that the source of inspiration was Dr. Ginger Campbell’s Brain Science Podcast, which explores recent discoveries in neuroscience, as well as Dr. Thomas Metzinger’s scientific research and philosophical study of consciousness and the self.

Musically, the band stated that they "focused more on the overall musicality which included more instrumental layers than we used before." Sputnik Music noted that the band dropped most of the aggressive thrash metal elements in favor of more melodic, modern, mid-tempo and mechanical style. About.com reviewer wrote that the album's genre is difficult to pigeon hole, featuring elements of industrial, psychedelic and soundtrack music among technical metal.

Track listing
Lie Awake - 5:03
G.U.T. - 3:39
Multiverse - 4:44
End Of Infinity - 4:12
Transfection - 3:55
Clean Room - 4:50
Currents - 2:50
Traveler - 4:23
Ego Machine - 4:29
Being No One - 4:47
Entanglement - 4:15
Mindsteps - 6:52

Personnel
Believer
Kurt Bachman - vocals, guitar
Joey Daub - drums
Jeff King - keyboards, programming
Kevin Leaman - guitar
Elton Nestler - bass guitar, programming

Additional musicians
Trav Turner - additional drums (on track 1)
Jim Thomas - guitar technician, main personnel, setup

Production
Kevin "131" Gutierrez - additional production, mixing
Joel DuBay - mixing assistant
Maor Appelbaum - mastering engineer
The Trauma Team - engineer

Design
Tom Bejgrowicz - photography
Kira Beth - model
Tim Engle - photography
Michael Rosner - design, layout, paintings

References

Believer (band) albums
2011 albums